Brian Harper LeBel (born July 14, 1963) is a former American football long snapper in the National Football League for the San Diego Chargers, Seattle Seahawks, Philadelphia Eagles, Atlanta Falcons, Chicago Bears and Baltimore Ravens. He played college football at Colorado State University.

Early years
LeBel attended Notre Dame High School in Sherman Oaks, California. He practiced track, football, baseball and basketball.

He accepted a football scholarship from Colorado State University. He had 99 receptions for 1,057 yards to finish fourth on the school's All-time receiving list.

Professional career
LeBel was selected by the Kansas City Chiefs in the 12th round (321st overall) of the 1985 NFL Draft. He was released on August 12.

After the NFLPA strike was declared on the third week of the 1987 season, those contests were canceled (reducing the 16-game season to 15) and the NFL decided that the games would be played with replacement players. He was signed to be a part of the San Diego Chargers replacement team. He was released after one game.

In 1988, he was signed as a free agent by the Dallas Cowboys. He was released on August 1. On August 16, he was signed by the Tampa Bay Buccaneers. He was released on August 22.

Personal life
LeBel is currently a weekend sports talk show host on Sportsradio 92.9 The Game in Atlanta.

References

1963 births
Living people
People from Granada Hills, Los Angeles
Players of American football from Los Angeles
American football long snappers
American football tight ends
Colorado State Rams football players
San Diego Chargers players
Seattle Seahawks players
Atlanta Falcons players
Baltimore Ravens players
Chicago Bears players
Philadelphia Eagles players
National Football League replacement players